Joy Adowaa Buolamwini is a Ghanaian-American-Canadian computer scientist and digital activist based at the MIT Media Lab. Buolamwini introduces herself as a poet of code, daughter of art and science. She founded the Algorithmic Justice League, an organization that works to challenge bias in decision-making software, using art, advocacy, and research to highlight the social implications and harms of artificial intelligence (AI).

Early life and education 
Buolamwini was born in Edmonton, Alberta, grew up in Mississippi and attended Cordova High School. At age 9, she was inspired by Kismet, the MIT robot, and taught herself XHTML, JavaScript and PHP. She was a competitive pole vaulter.

As an undergraduate, Buolamwini studied computer science at Georgia Institute of Technology, where she researched health informatics. Buolamwini graduated as a Stamps President's Scholar from Georgia Tech in 2012, and was the youngest finalist of the Georgia Tech InVenture Prize in 2009.

Buolamwini is a Rhodes Scholar, a Fulbright fellow, a Stamps Scholar, an Astronaut Scholar and an Anita Borg Institute scholar. As a Rhodes Scholar, she studied learning and technology at the University of Oxford where she was a student based at Jesus College, Oxford. During her scholarship she took part in the first formal Service Year, working on community focused projects.  She was awarded a Master's Degree in Media Arts & Sciences from MIT in 2017 for research supervised by Ethan Zuckerman. She was awarded a PhD degree in Media Arts & Sciences from the MIT Media Lab in 2022 with a thesis on Facing the Coded Gaze with Evocative Audits and Algorithmic Audits.

Career and research
In 2011, Buolamwini worked with the trachoma program at the Carter Center to develop an Android-based assessment system for use in Ethiopia.  As a Fulbright fellow, in 2013 she worked with local computer scientists in Zambia to help Zambian youth to become technology creators. On September 14, 2016, Buolamwini appeared at the White House summit on Computer Science for All.

She is a researcher at the MIT Media Lab, where she works to identify bias in algorithms and to develop practices for accountability during their design; at the lab, Buolamwini is a member of Ethan Zuckerman's Center for Civic Media group. During her research, Buolamwini showed facial recognition systems 1,000 faces and asked them to identify whether faces were female or male, and found that software found it hard to identify dark-skinned women. Her project, Gender Shades, became part of her MIT thesis. Her 2018 paper Gender Shades: Intersectional Accuracy Disparities in Commercial Gender Classification, prompted responses from IBM and Microsoft, who swiftly improved their software. She also created the Aspire Mirror, a device that lets users see a reflection of themselves based on what inspires them. Her program, Algorithmic Justice League, aims to highlight the bias in code that can lead to discrimination against underrepresented groups. She has created two films, 'Code4Rights' and 'Algorithmic Justice League: Unmasking Bias'. She served as Chief Technology Officer (CTO) for Techturized Inc, a haircare technology company.

Buolamwini's research was cited in 2020 as an influence for Google and Microsoft in addressing gender and race bias in their products and processes.

Art activism 
Buolamwini founded the Algorithmic Justice League (AJL) in 2016 to promote equitable and accountable artificial intelligence (AI). The AJL organization combines art and research to point out potential societal implications and harms of AI. The company works to raise public awareness of the impacts of AI, and promote further research in the area.

The AJL website provides information and a live blog. There are several sections on the site where users can share stories, and donate or write to US Congressional representatives. In 2019, Buolamwini testified before the United States House Committee on Oversight and Reform about the risks of facial recognition technology.

Voicing Erasure 
The Voicing Erasure section on the AJL website hosts spoken pieces by Buolamwini, Allison Koenecke, Safiya Noble, Ruha Benjamin, Kimberlé Crenshaw, Megan Smith, and Sasha Costanza-Chock about bias in voice systems. Buolamwini and Koenecke are the lead researchers on the website working to uncovering biases of voice systems. They've written that speech recognition systems have the most trouble with African-American Vernacular English speakers, and that these systems are secretly listening to users' conversations. They have also written about what they regard as harmful gender stereotypes perpetuated by the voice recognition systems in Siri, Amazon Alexa and Microsoft Cortana.

The Coded Gaze 
The Coded Gaze is a mini-documentary which debuted at the Museum of Fine Arts, Boston in 2016, and is currently available via YouTube. Buolamwini uses the mini documentary to talk about the bias which she believes lies in artificial intelligence's function. The inspiration for the mini documentary and her research came when she was at MIT, creating her art "Aspire Mirror" which uses facial recognition to reflect another person who inspires a user, onto that user's face. Buolamwini anticipated having Serena Williams, another dark-skinned woman, reflected onto her face. However, the technology did not recognize her face. Buolamwini's research investigated why this happened, and consequently led Buolamwini to conclude that the exclusion of people who look like her was a result of a practice she called the "Coded Gaze." She further discusses this concept in the mini documentary, "The Coded Gaze." The documentary explores how AI can be subject to racial and gender biases that reflect the views and cultural backgrounds of those who develop it.

Coded Bias 

Coded Bias is a documentary film directed by Shalini Kantayya that features Buolamwini’s research about AI inaccuracies in facial recognition technology and automated assessment software.  It focuses on what the film's creators regard as a lack of regulation of facial recognition tools sold by IBM, Microsoft, and Amazon, and which they say perpetuates racial and gender bias. The film describes a dispute between Brooklyn tenants and a building management company that tried to use facial recognition to control entry to a building. The film featured Weapons of Math Destruction author Cathy O'Neill and members of Big Brother Watch in London, including Silkie Carlo. On April 5, 2021, the documentary was made available to stream on Netflix.

Exhibitions 
Projects conducted by Algorithmic Justice League have been exhibited at art institutions including the Barbican Centre, London, UK and Ars Electronica, Linz, Austria.

 The Criminal Type (2019) Exhibition at APEXART, New York, NY, US
  Understanding AI (2019) Exhibition at Ars Electronica Center, Linz, Austria
  AI: More than Human (2019) Exhibition at the Barbican Centre, London, UK
 Nine Moments for Now (2018) Exhibition at the Hutchins Center, Harvard University, Cambridge, MA, US
  Big Bang Data (2018) Exhibition at MIT Museum, Cambridge, MA, US

Awards and honors 
In 2017, Buolamwini was awarded the grand prize in the professional category in the Search for Hidden Figures contest, tied to the release of the film Hidden Figures in December 2016. The contest, sponsored by PepsiCo and 21st Century Fox, was intended to "help uncover the next generation of female leaders in science, technology, engineering and math,"  and attracted 7,300 submissions from young women across the United States.

Buolamwini delivered a TEDx talk at Beacon Street entitled How I'm fighting bias in algorithms. In 2018 she appeared on TED Radio Hour. She was featured on Amy Poehler's Smart Girls in 2018. Fast Company magazine listed her as one of four "design heroes who are defending democracy online". She was listed as one of BBC's 100 Women in 2018.

In 2019, Buolamwini was listed in Fortune magazine's 2019 list of the "World's 50 Greatest Leaders". The magazine also described her as "the conscience of the A.I. revolution". She also made the inaugural Time 100 Next list in 2019. In 2020, Buolamwini featured in a women's empowerment campaign by the clothing company Levi's for International Women's Day. She was also featured in the documentary Coded Bias.

Personal life
Buolamwini has lived in Ghana; Barcelona, Spain; Oxford, United Kingdom; and in the U.S., Memphis, Tennessee and Atlanta, Georgia.

References 

Living people
American women computer scientists
American computer scientists
Georgia Tech alumni
MIT School of Architecture and Planning alumni
African-American computer scientists
African-American activists
Scientists from Mississippi
Activists from Mississippi
American Rhodes Scholars
21st-century American scientists
21st-century American women scientists
MIT Media Lab people
Scientists from Edmonton
BBC 100 Women
Year of birth missing (living people)
Ghanaian women computer scientists
Ghanaian women activists
Ghanaian computer scientists
American people of Ghanaian descent
American women academics
21st-century African-American women
21st-century African-American scientists
Data activism
Fulbright alumni